Javier Laynez Potisek (born June 2, 1959) is a Mexican jurist and since December 10, 2015, a member of the Supreme Court of Justice of the Nation (SCJN) of Mexico.

He holds a Law Degree from the Regiomontana University and a Master's in Tax Administration, a Master's in Public Law and a Doctor of Public Law from the Paris-Dauphine University of Paris IX Dauphine.

He has been a professor of Administrative Law, Law and Regulation, and Legal Structure of the Mexican State, at the undergraduate and master's level, at the Colegio de México and at the Centro de Investigacion y Docencia Económicas (CIDE), and speaker at various seminars, courses and conferences in academic institutions, international forums, and public institutions.

He is the author of several publications in the areas of Constitutional Law and Public Administration.

He has actively participated in a series of studies on Comparative Law, including the English, French, North American, Argentinean and Chilean Legal System, related to the implementation of the new Accusatory Criminal System, which has allowed The table various reforms to criminal law in our country with the aim of creating a solid legal platform that operates in a practical way for the treatment of tax and financial crimes.

On December 10, 2015 he was ratified by the Senate of the Republic as Minister of the Supreme Court of the Nation with 81 votes in favor.

Trajectory 
 He began his career in 1983, within the Fiscal Prosecutor's Office of the Federation, at the time acting as Attorney-at-Law, following up contentious trials before the then Fiscal Tribunal of the Federation. Later he spent the next five years in the city of Paris, France, doing his Masters and PhD studies.
 Entered as Director of Legislation and Normativity in the former Secretariat of Programming and Budget in the year 1990; Within its main functions were the elaboration of draft legislation initiatives, decrees and regulations within the competence of the Secretariat.
 In 1992, assumed the position of Director of Normativity within the Secretariat of Public Education, in which I performed functions until the year of 1994, standing out between them, The preparation and implementation of the decentralization system of basic education in the country.
 In May 2005 entered like holder of the Legal Assistant and International Affairs of the Attorney General of the Republic, where as main successes had to litigate before the Supreme Court of Justice of the Nation the necessary criteria for the implementation and respect of bilateral international agreements on extradition, the promotion and follow-up of federal trials filed by the Attorney General's Office on behalf of the Federation, chairing the Professionalization Committee, Of the police and ministerial career, with special emphasis on training and education in the field of human rights to police officers, as well as participate in the elaboration and negotiation of the Constitutional and Legal Reform in Narcomenudeo.
 Dr. Javier Laynez Potisek was Deputy Legal Adviser of the Federal Executive during the six years of the presidents: Ernesto Zedillo Ponce de Leon and Vicente Fox Quezada where he had among its main functions to be a member of the initiatives Of constitutional and legal reforms, particularly in the area of comprehensive reform of the public security and justice system, creation of the Federal Judicial Council and the implementation of controversies and actions of unconstitutionality, as well as participation in the drafting and negotiations of the reform Constitution for the recognition of the jurisdiction of the International Criminal Court.

Federal Prosecutor's Office 

In the legislative part, it emphasizes, fundamentally, the energy reform as well as the decisive participation in the reform of the Public Administration, that proposed President Felipe Calderón Hinojosa, compacting the administrative structures.

Under his administration, favorable sentences were obtained in the ISSSTE Law, having more than 100,000 amparos gained. As regards the IETU Law, a favorable judgment was obtained in the first instance.

In the case of criminal investigations, the number of arrest warrants for crimes committed against the treasury within the scope of the powers of the Office of the Attorney General has increased, while it has been responsible for litigating financial criminal matters arising from the crisis 2008.

Teaching 

Dr. Javier Laynez Potisek has been professor in different universities of Law and Academic Institutions in Mexico in which they stand out:
 Professor of Administrative Law I. Center for Research and Economic Teaching (CIDE).
 Professor of the Master in Public Management. Center for Research and Economic Teaching (CIDE).
 Professor of Legal Structure of the Mexican State in the Master's in Public Administration. Center for Research and Economic Teaching (CIDE).
 Professor of the Administrative Law Course. Training Program for Tax Lawyers of the Tax Administration Service (SAT).
 Professor of Administrative and Tax Law. The Colegio de México.
 Professor of Income Tax. National College for Professional Education.
 Professor of Tax Law I (general part) and Tax Law II (tax litigation). Universidad Regiomontana, Faculty of Accounting.
 Member of the Advisory Board of the Master in Administrative Law. Autonomous Technological Institute of Mexico (ITAM).
 Member of the Academic Council of the Degree of Degree in Law. Center for Economic Research and Teaching (CIDE).
 Speaker in different forums, seminars, courses and conferences. : National Autonomous University of Mexico (UNAM), Chamber of Deputies, Senate, Autonomous Technological Institute of Mexico (ITAM), Tax Administration Service (SAT), Federal District Department (DDF), Universidad Anáhuac.

Distinctions 
Throughout his career, Dr. Javier Laynez Potisek has earned himself several awards including:
 Presea Isidro Fabela to Public Merit; Granted by the National Federation of Lawyers to the Service of Mexico, in July 1997.
 The Silver Medal of Honor granted by the Government of the Republic of Austria in August 2005.
 The decoration of Saint Raymundo de Peña Fort, granted by the Kingdom of Spain.

Some publications 
 "Do not use protection as an instrument of fiscal planning", May 2009, No. 166, Vol. XXV.
 "Between the energy reform and the fiscal protection", Magazine The World of the Lawyer, No. 112, August 2008.
 "Balance between the Executive and Legislative Powers. Governance: new actors, new challenges ", IBERGOB-MEXICO, Ed. Porrúa, Vol. II, Mexico 2002.
 "The Supreme Court of Justice as Constitutional Court: its impact on the Federal Public Administration". Seminar: Mexican Justice towards the 21st Century. UNAM-Senate of the Republic, Mexico 1997.
 "Constitutional Justice in Political-Electoral Matters". Seminar on Defense and Protection of the Constitution. UNAM 1997.
 "The Legal Department of the Federal Executive". In the publication Strengthening the Rule of Law. FENASEM, Mexico 1996.
 "The Disincorporation of Parastatal Entities: A Return to the Minimum State?" Report of the International Seminar on State Restructuring. INAP 1987.

References

External links 
 Javier Laynez Potisek will be new minister of the SCJN 
 A lagoon to the Supreme Court? 
 "Send presidential candidates to the Senate for the SCJN": 
 "Interview with the Attorney General of the Federation, Javier Laynez potisek, by Adriana Pérez Cañedo, driver of the half-day issue of the Noticiaro approach, at 100.1 fm.": /SALAPRENSA/sala_prensa_estenograficas/jlp_20100826_ent_enfoque.pdf.
 "Laynez Potisek is appointed prosecutor of the Federation": .
 "Laynez Potisek was appointed prosecutor": .

1959 births
20th-century Mexican lawyers
Lawyers from Coahuila
Mexican people of French descent
Mexican people of Slovene descent
Living people
Supreme Court of Justice of the Nation justices
Universidad Regiomontana alumni
21st-century Mexican judges